This is a list of the songs that reached number one in Mexico in 1982, according to the Notitas Musicales magazine with data provided by Radio Mil(which also provided charts for Billboard's "Hits of the World" between 1969 and 1981).

Notitas Musicales was a bi-weekly magazine that published two record charts:

"Canciones que México canta" ("Songs that Mexico sings"), which listed the Top 10 most popular Spanish-language songs in Mexico, and
"Hit Parade", which was a Top 10 of the most popular songs in Mexico  that were in languages other than Spanish.

Chart history

See also
1982 in music

References

Sources
Print editions of the Notitas Musicales magazine.

1982 in Mexico
Mexico
1982